Tour Skylight is a residential skyscraper in Puteaux, in La Défense, the business district of the Paris metropolitan area. It does include shops and educational activities.

Inaugurated on November 29, 2017, by Patrick Devedjian, the tower is 76.77 meters high.

It notably hosts a campus of the IÉSEG School of Management.

See also 
 La Défense
 List of tallest buildings and structures in the Paris region
 List of tallest buildings in France

References

External links 
 Tour Skylight

Skylight
La Défense
Residential buildings completed in 2017
21st-century architecture in France